Relevé can refer to:
Relevé (dance), rising onto or standing on the toes or balls of one or both feet
Relevé (population ecology), a plot that encloses the minimal area under a species-area curve
Relevé (phytosociology), a plot or table of phytosociological data
Relevé (French cuisine), an obsolete term for a type of entrée

Other 

 Relevés, an episode of the series Hannibal
 Relève (Vichy regime), a work program in World War II France